Jamsar is a small village in Bikaner, Rajasthan, India. There were 467 households in the village in 2011. Located in a desert environment, the nearest city is Bikaner.

Geography 

Demographics 
As of the 2011 Indian census, Jamsar had a population of 2,869. Males constitute 53% of the population and females 47%. Jamsar has an average literacy rate of 43%: male literacy is 67%, and female literacy is 33%.

Gagainathji Samadhi 
Baba Shri Gangainath, an 'Ayi-panthi' Nath Yogi, took ‘Samadhi’ on 31st Dec’1983 at 5:22 am at Jamsar. Shri Ramlal Ji Siyag, founder & patron of Adhyatma Vigyan Satsang Kendra, Jodhpur is the most well known disciple of  Shri Gangainath Ji, whom he had handed over the title of Gurudom (gurupad). A grand program is organized at Jamsar Ashram of Baba Shri Gangainath by his disciples who gather here from all over India to pay homage and seek his blessings on this day.

References 

Villages in Bikaner district
piro ki nagri jamsar